George Chien-Cheng Tseng is a Biostatistician and Professor and Vice Chair for Research in the Department of Biostatistics (primary), Computational & Systems Biology (secondary) and Human Genetics (secondary) at University of Pittsburgh Graduate School of Public Health.

Education
Tseng studied Mathematics at Bachelor of Science (1997) and Master of Science (1999) level, both at the National Taiwan University. He gained his ScD in Biostatistics from Harvard University in 2003, under the supervision of Wing Hung Wong.

Research
Tseng is leading a research group of Bioinformatics and Statistical learning at University of Pittsburgh. His group focuses on developing Meta-analysis and Machine learning tools to analyze Omics data, which uses resampling methods and Bayesian statistics extensively. Tseng has developed Tight Clustering, a method for cluster genomics data with scattered genes, and Adaptively Weighted Fisher's method, a method for Meta-analysis of studywise p-values with both consensus and differential results.

Awards and honours
Tseng has been awarded a silver medal prize in International Mathematical Olympiad in 1993. He has been awarded Pittsburgh Statistician of the Year in 2017 by Pittsburgh Chapter of the American Statistics Association.
He became a fellow of the American Statistical Association in 2017. He is selected as one of the recipients of the Provost's Award for Excellence in Mentoring at University of Pittsburgh in 2019.

Personal life
In 1995, Tseng was Baptized as a Christian in Taipei. He is married and resides in Pittsburgh with six children.

References

Taiwanese bioinformaticians
Living people
National Taiwan University alumni
Harvard University alumni
University of Pittsburgh faculty
International Mathematical Olympiad participants
Fellows of the American Statistical Association
1975 births